Dobroselica is a village in the municipality of Čajetina, western Serbia. According to the 2011 census, the village has a population of 367 people.

There is a Serbian Orthodox church in Dobroselica. It is dedicated to Saint Elijah the Prophet.

References

External links
Seoski turizam Zlatibora: Dobroselica 

Populated places in Zlatibor District